Corinne Bodmer  (born 23 September 1970) is a Swiss freestyle skier. She was born in Lausanne. She competed at the 1998 and 2002 Winter Olympics, in women's moguls.

References

External links 
 

1970 births
Living people
Sportspeople from Lausanne
Swiss female freestyle skiers
Olympic freestyle skiers of Switzerland
Freestyle skiers at the 1998 Winter Olympics
Freestyle skiers at the 2002 Winter Olympics